Assita Toure (born 24 November 1992) is an Ivorian swimmer. She was born in Treichville. She competed at the 2012 Summer Olympics in London.

References

External links 
 

1992 births
Living people
Sportspeople from Abidjan
Ivorian female swimmers
Olympic swimmers of Ivory Coast
Swimmers at the 2012 Summer Olympics